James Fred Bateman, Jr. (1937 – January 10, 2012) was a noted economic historian. He served as the Nicholas A. Beadles Professor in the Terry College of Business at the University of Georgia.  Bateman's main areas of research were US 19th century agricultural and industrial economic history. He served from 1982–83 as president of the Business History Conference and in 2010 he was elected as a Fellow of the Cliometric Society.

Selected publications 
 Atack, J. and Bateman, F. (1987). To their own soil: Agriculture in the Antebellum North. Ames: Iowa State University Press.
 Bateman, F., and Weiss, T. J. (1981). A deplorable scarcity: The failure of industrialization in the slave economy. Chapel Hill: University of North Carolina Press.

References and notes 

1937 births
2012 deaths
Indiana University faculty
University of Georgia faculty
Economic historians